The Romanian Nationhood Party (NR or PNR) is a far-right, Romanian nationalist political party. It was founded by Ninel Peia, a former member of the Social Democratic Party (PSD). The party is critical of Hungarian-born American billionaire George Soros.

Electoral history

Legislative elections

Notes:

1 NR had signed a protocol with AUR to have their candidates elected on AUR's list

Presidential elections

References

External links

Anti-globalization political parties
Anti-immigration politics in Europe
Anti-Islam political parties in Europe
Conservative parties in Romania
Eastern Orthodox political parties
Eurosceptic parties in Romania
Far-right political parties in Romania
National conservative parties
Nationalist parties in Romania
Political parties in Romania
Right-wing parties in Romania
Romanian nationalist parties
Social conservative parties